The 1969–70 Football League season was Birmingham City Football Club's 67th in the Football League and their 29th in the Second Division. They finished in 18th position in the 22-team division. They entered the 1969–70 FA Cup in the third round proper and the League Cup in the second round; they lost their opening match in each competition, to Chelsea and Brighton & Hove Albion respectively.

Stan Cullis resigned as manager and retired from football in March 1970, and chief scout Don Dorman and coach Bill Shorthouse finished the playing season as caretaker managers. After unsuccessful approaches were made to Don Revie, Brian Clough and Ronnie Allen, Brighton & Hove Albion manager Freddie Goodwin took on the job at the end of May.

Twenty players made at least one appearance in nationally organised first-team competition, and there were eleven different goalscorers. Defenders Ray Martin and Bobby Thomson played in all 44 first-team matches over the season. Phil Summerill finished as leading goalscorer for the second successive season, with 13 goals, all of which came in league competition.

Football League Second Division

League table (part)

FA Cup

League Cup

Appearances and goals

Numbers in parentheses denote appearances as substitute.
Players with name struck through and marked  left the club during the playing season.
Players with names in italics and marked * were on loan from another club for the whole of their season with Birmingham.

See also
Birmingham City F.C. seasons

References
General
 
 
 
 Source for match dates and results: 
 Source for lineups, appearances, goalscorers and attendances: Matthews (2010), Complete Record, pp. 374–75.
 Source for kit: "Birmingham City". Historical Football Kits. Retrieved 22 May 2018.

Specific

Birmingham City F.C. seasons
Birmingham City